The 2011 Memphis Tigers football team represented the University of Memphis in the 2011 NCAA Division I FBS football season. The Tigers were led by second year head coach Larry Porter and played their home games at the Liberty Bowl Memorial Stadium. They are a member of the East Division of Conference USA. They finished the season 2–10, 1–7 in C-USA play to finish in last place in the East Division

Head coach Larry Porter was fired at the end of the season after going 3–21 in two seasons.

Schedule

References

Memphis
Memphis Tigers football seasons
Memphis Tigers football